Jessica Karjala (born November 17, 1965) is an American politician who serves as a Democratic member of the Montana House of Representatives, representing the 48th district.

Political career 

Karjala served as vice chair of House Human Services Committee in 2017, 2019 and 2021. She has served on the State Administration and Veterans Affairs Committee for four sessions.

Electoral record

References

1965 births
Living people
University of Montana alumni
21st-century American politicians
21st-century American women politicians
Women state legislators in Montana
Democratic Party members of the Montana House of Representatives